Atiega or Atiaga is a hamlet and concejo located in the municipality of Añana, in Álava province, Basque Country, Spain.

References

Populated places in Álava